Old Crest on a New Wave is the ninth studio album by the English musician, singer-songwriter, and guitarist Dave Mason. The album includes a duet with Michael Jackson, "Save Me", which peaked at No. 71 on the Billboard Hot 100 and at No. 70 on the Billboard R&B singles chart.

Track listing

Personnel 
 Dave Mason – lead and backing vocals, guitars
 Mark Stein – pianos, organ, synthesizers, backing vocals 
 Mike Finnigan – acoustic piano (3), organ (4, 8)
 Jim Krueger – guitars
 Bob Glaub – bass
 Rick Jaeger – drums
 Ray Revis – percussion
 Michael Jackson – lead and backing vocals (6)

Production 
 Dave Mason – producer 
 Joe Wissert – producer 
 Ed Thacker – engineer 
 Mike Reese – mastering at The Mastering Lab (Hollywood, California).
 Tony Lane – art direction, design 
 Mara (Barry Gilbey and Sara Whittaker) – photography 

1980 albums
Dave Mason albums
Columbia Records albums
Albums produced by Dave Mason
Albums produced by Joe Wissert